Shri Vile Parle Kelavani Mandal (SVKM) is a Public charitable trust in India that runs and operates many educational schools, colleges and institutions across India.

History
SVKM started in 1934 when it took over the Rashtriya Shala, a school established in 1921, in the wake of the Swadeshi Movement and Indian Independence Movement. Over the years, it has made the Mumbai suburb of Vile Parle into an educational hub with over 40 schools and colleges under its wing. It has now spread to other Indian cities like Bangalore, Hyderabad, Chandigarh, Ahmedabad, Indore, Navi Mumbai, among others.

Institutions
Some of the institutions under the SVKM umbrella are mentioned below.

Cultural festivals
SVKM's colleges organise some of Mumbai's most attended inter-college festivals such as Umang of Narsee Monjee College, which has been tagged as Asia's fastest growing festival, and Kshitij of Mithibai College. From 13 to 16 January 2016, SVKM organised a festival called Yuva for the students and teachers of all institutions under its banner, holding competitions in 13 different sporting categories.

References

Educational charities
Charitable trusts
Charities based in India